Stelios Dimitrakakis (also known as Stylianos Dimitrakakis and Στυλιανός Δημητρακάκης) was born in Chania in 1903 and was the son of Rethymnon's judge and Minister of Parliament, Markos Dimitrakakis from 1864-1916. He studied law in Athens and political science in Paris.

Political career and honors

In 1929, he was appointed prefect of the Greek state of Drama, where he held substantial power until 1932. In 1941 he was the active minister of justice as part of the Tsouderos government and the Greek government in exile during Nazi occupation from April 21, 1941 - May 2, 1942.  Dimitrakakis was then appointed as temporary minister of the army from June 2, 1941 to May 2, 1942, and Minister of Justice and Labour, where he remained until April 14, 1944. He was instrumental in orchestrating the Greek brigades that are widely credited with freeing Crete of Nazi occupation during WWII through several operations that originated from the South of Crete and Cairo, Egypt, known as the Battle of Crete.

Personal life

He died on March 7, 1947, at the age of 44.  Since then the central road leading to the Rethmynon Town Hall is named in his honor, where it remains today.

References 

Stelios Dimitrakakis, "Rethymnon by Every Road and a Story" published by the Rethymnon Single Polycladic Lyceum, 1992.

Ambassador MacVeagh Reports: Greece, 1933-1947, by John O. Iatrides, published by Princeton Legacy Library, pp. 487.

The Battle of Crete, His Speech on the Anniversary of 1946 at the Attica Theater, by Stelios Dimitrakakis, published by Pancrete Union, 1966.

Stelios Dimitrakakis, the Minister of Interior and Labour named in the Official Members of the Greek Government in The London Gazette, 4 December 1942.

World War II Official Album by Peter McIntyre, 1941.  General Freyberg shown receiving the Greek Military Cross from the Greek Minister, Stelios Dimitrakakis.

List of Greek Ministers Throughout History, Stylianos Dimitrakakis, Minister of Justice, 1941

Crete: The Battle and the Resistance by Antony Beevor, 1991, published by John Murray.

British Policy Towards Greece During the Second World War 1941–1944, Procopis Papastratis, 1984, published by Cambridge University Press.

"Ill Met By Moonlight" by W. Stanley Moss, 1950, published by George G. Harrap and Co. Chronicling the abduction of a German general from the island of Crete.

The Greek Government-in-Exile 1941-4, Richard Clogg, 1979, published by The International History Review, Cambridge University Press.

Inside Hitler's Greece: The Experience of Occupation, 1941–44, Mark Mzaower, 1993, published by Yale University Press.

A photo of Stelios Dimitrakakis congratulating an officer

Stelios Dimitrakakis 

Year of birth missing
1947 deaths
People from Chania